is a former Japanese football player. She played for Japan national team.

National team career
Shiratori was born on June 6, 1968. In October 1984, when she was 16 years old, she was selected Japan national team for tour for China. On October 17, she debuted for Japan against Italy. She played 5 games for Japan until 1986.

National team statistics

References

1968 births
Living people
Japanese women's footballers
Japan women's international footballers
Shimizudaihachi Pleiades players
Women's association footballers not categorized by position